The Liouesso Hydroelectric Power Station is a  hydroelectric power station in the Republic of the Congo. The government-owned power station was commercially commissioned in May 2017. Constructed by the China Gezhouba Group, the renewable energy infrastructure project cost approximately US$110 million to construct.

Location
The power station is located in the town of Ouesso, in Ouesso District, in the Sangha Region of the Republic of the Congo. Ouesso sits on the Sangha River, a tributary of the Congo River, near the international border with Cameroon.

The geographical coordinates of Liouesso Hydroelectric Power Station are 1°26'07.0"N, 16°10'42.0"E (Latitude:1.435278; Longitude:16.178333).

History
In 2006, the engineering, procurement and construction (EPC) contract for this power station was awarded to Clackson Power Company of South Africa. Later, the EPC contract was switched to the China Gezhouba Group Company (CGGC). CGGC was able to achieve financial close for this power station, in January 2014. On 30 May 2017, the completed power station was commercially commissioned.

Overview
The power house comprises three Francis type turbines, each rated at 6.4 MW, for capacity generation of 19.2 MW. The energy generated here is distributed to the town of Ouesso and to neighboring villages in Ouesso District, in the Sangha Region.

Construction costs and funding
It has been reported that the construction of this HPP cost about US$110 million. Other reliable references have indicated that the government of the Republic of the Congo invested US$92 million. The table below illustrates the funding sources for the power station.

Rehabilitation
In May 2022, the government of the Republic of the Congo signed agreements with CGGC and ENERGAZ, a Congolese IPP, to rehabilitate this power station, whose output had drastically reduced and to expand the distribution network of the power plant which is not yet grid-connected.

See also

 List of power stations in the Republic of the Congo

References

External links
 Liouesso Hydropower Project

Power stations in the Republic of the Congo
Sangha Department (Republic of the Congo)
Hydroelectric power stations in the Republic of the Congo
2017 establishments in the Republic of the Congo
Energy infrastructure completed in 2017
Dams completed in 2017